Alfredo Oscar Saint-Jean (11 November 1926 – 2 September 1987) was an Argentine Army division general and politician, who served as President of Argentina in 1982.

Earlier public role

Following the 1976 coup and the intervention of the Argentine military in public affairs during the National Reorganization Process, Alfredo Saint-Jean was one of the generals who held senior roles. He served as interior minister from 1981, having been appointed by General Leopoldo Galtieri.

President of Argentina
He briefly served as President of Argentina from 18 June 1982 to 1 July 1982, during a period of military rule, after Galtieri was ousted from office owing to the country's defeat in the Falklands War.

Succession

Saint-Jean's brief period as president in June and July 1982 ended when he was succeeded by General Reynaldo Bignone.

See also

 National Reorganization Process

1926 births
1987 deaths
People from Chascomús
Presidents of Argentina
Argentine generals
Argentine people of French descent